Taubman is a surname. Notable people with the surname include:

 A. Alfred Taubman (1924–2015), American businessman, investor, and philanthropist
 Brandon Taubman (born 1985/1986), baseball executive
 David Taubman, electrical and electronics engineer
 Dorothy Taubman (1917–2013), American music teacher and lecturer
 George Taubman Goldie (1846–1925), Manx co-founder of Nigeria
 Howard Taubman (1907–1996), American music critic, theater critic, and author
 Nicholas F. Taubman (born 1935), American businessman, politician, and diplomat
 Paul Taubman (1939–1995), American economist
 William Chase Taubman (born  1941), American political scientist

See also
Tobman

German-language surnames
Jewish surnames